The Rugby Europe International Championships is the European Championship for tier 2 and tier 3 rugby union nations.

The tournament is split into 5 levels, each with 5 or 6 teams. Its highest level is now called the Rugby Europe Championship and, unofficially, referred to as the Six Nations B. All levels play on a one-year cycle, replacing the old format of a two-year cycle, with the teams playing each other both home and away. From September 2016,  there will still be an annual champion, however a format change means each year sees teams promoted and relegated between the levels.

History

International championships before 2000
Following the exclusion of France from the Five Nations Tournament after the 1931 edition, France joined with Italy, Romania, Germany, Spain, Belgium, Portugal, Netherlands, and Catalonia to create the International Amateur Rugby Federation (FIRA, now Rugby Europe) as an alternative to the International Rugby Football Board (now World Rugby). Three tournaments were held from 1936 to 1938, with France winning all three. Following the Second World War, France was readmitted into the Five Nations Championship, but they also competed in the only two tournaments organised by FIRA, the Rugby Union European Cup, held in 1952 and 1954, winning them both.

From 1965, FIRA attempted to revitalise the European competition by creating the FIRA Nations Cup (1965-1973) and then the FIRA Trophy (1973-1997); however, France fielded a France A side made up mostly of university students. While the French students won many of the tournaments, Romania also had their share of tournament titles. In the late 1990s, the championship became irregular, with some editions not taking place because of qualifications for the World Cup. Finally, the European Nations Cup began in 2000, no longer including France and Italy, as they now played in the reformed Six Nations Championship.

European Nations Cup: initial format (since 2000)

After the setup of the divisional system in 2000, Romania won the first competition with maximum points, The initial season also included Morocco.

Russia then replaced Morocco in 2001 when Georgia secured the title and were crowned champions after a 31–20 win over Romania in Bucharest. As the competition format changed from a one-year tournament to two-years, the Netherlands were not relegated after this season.

Romania started 2002 trailing Georgia after the 2001 results, but managed to win all of the remaining five games, including a 31–23 victory in Tbilisi.

Portugal were 16–15 winners over Romania in Lisbon and installed themselves at the top of the 2003–04 table. In the second half of the competition, Romania won 36–6 against Portugal in Constanța, but went down 24–33 to Russia in Krasnodar. Then Portugal clinched their first title with a last-minute 19–18 home win over Russia. The Russia – Czech Republic game was rescheduled due to bad weather and was eventually cancelled.

The 2005–06 championships also served as a qualifying pool for the 2007 Rugby World Cup. Romania triumphed finishing level on points with Georgia, while Ukraine were relegated after losing all matches.

The 2007–08 edition saw the return of the Spanish to the top division. The winners were Georgia, following their display at the 2007 Rugby World Cup. The Russians recorded their best ever placement, finishing in second. The Czech Republic were the team to finish on the bottom of the table, losing all of their matches, relegating them back to Division 2A.

A new format was decided at the beginning of 2009. Each calendar year had its own champion, but the cumulated ranking over two years determined which team was relegated. The 2009–10 edition was also basis for European qualification to the 2011 Rugby World Cup. The 2009 season saw the début of Germany in the top division, Georgia defended their title, and there were wins for Portugal and Russia in Bucharest.

Faced with the possibility of missing a Rugby World Cup for the first time, Romania were managed the 2010 title. This feat was however not enough to overtake Georgia and Russia, who helped by their good results from the previous year, gained the automatic qualification for the 2011 RWC, leaving Romania to go through the Play-Off Qualification Rounds. Germany were relegated after failing to win any games.

Georgia won the 2011 edition, after beating Romania 18–11 in Tbilisi. The promoted team, Ukraine, lost all but one of their matches, single win over Portugal.

European Nations Cup: second format (from 2010 to 2016) 
For the 2010–2012 competition (and promotion and relegation between groups going forward to successive competitions), the top two divisions (previously 1 and 2A) were redefined as 1A and 1B, both having six teams (previously six and five). The next four levels (previously 2B, 3A, 3B and 3C) become 2A-2D, under the new system, with the remnants of Division 3D making up the initial group of teams labelled as Division 3. In principle, each division is to encompass a different type of competition.

In Division 1, groups have six teams (meaning more matches and thus more travel), a significant fraction of the players are assumed to be professional or semi-professional (meaning that fixtures are, as often as possible, scheduled within the IRB's international fixtures time windows when clubs must release players for national duty), and only one team is promoted and one relegated every two years (meaning that the competitions are more stable).

In Division 2, groups have only five teams each (usually meaning one home match and one away match in the Autumn, and the same in the Spring, for each team), it is assumed that the majority of players are amateurs (meaning scheduling is not as limited), and in addition to the traditional automatic first-promoted-last-relegated system, fourth place from the higher pool will play second place from the lower pool after every two-year competition, with the winner taking the position in the higher pool. From a five-team group, one team is promoted, one team is relegated and two teams play in playoffs. Thus, a maximum of four of a pool's five teams could change from one two-year competition to the next.

In Division 3, a single-location, short-time-period (one week or 10 days) tournament is organised once per year. This minimises travel costs for teams and time-off-work requirements for players, and allows the flexibility of having a different membership every year, rather than requiring the membership to be constant over two years. The best performing team over two years of tournaments is promoted to Division 2.

In the year of transition to the new system (2010), there were no relegations from any division below the highest, because the second-highest (old 2A, new 1B) was expanded by one team.

International Championships: third format (from 2016 to 2022)
In the event, and following a penaltyFrom September 2016, the European Nations Cup became the Rugby Europe International Championships, made up of five levels or divisions:
 Level 1 - Championship. The top six ranked European teams outside the Six Nations contest the annual title. Replaces the former Division 1A.
 Level 2 - Trophy. The next six ranked European teams bid for the Trophy title. Replaces the former Division 1B.
 Level 3 - Conference 1. Division 2, A through to D, becomes the new Conference level, where twenty teams are separated into two Conferences made up of ten teams each, based on their previous year rankings. Each conference is then split into two, North and South, where teams could change each year depending on the competing teams - nations closest to boundary moved from North to South and vice versa each season as necessary to geographically balance the conferences.
 Level 4 - Conference 2
 Level 5 - Development. Replaces Division 3.

A promotion and relegation play-off system is maintained across all levels every year, moving away from the two-year system in place since 2003, meaning teams will be promoted and relegated every year.

The best two teams in the 2022 Rugby Europe Championship will qualify for the 2023 Rugby World Cup and the third team will qualify for its final qualification tournament in November 2022. In the event, and following a penalty to Spain for fielding an ineligible player, Georgia and Romania qualified directly from the championship, and Portugal, who qualified for the final qualifier, won that tournament to qualify for the World Cup.

A statement was released by the Polish Rugby Union in December 2021 confirming that the Rugby Europe Championship, will expand to 8 teams in 2022/2023 season. To accommodate this expansion, no team will be relegated from the top tier, while two teams from the second tier Trophy Championship will be promoted following the completion of the 2021/2022 Championship. The serpentine system is applied to allocate each team to their respective groups. Each team will play a total of five games (three round robin group matches to detremine the team's path and two play-off matches). Seeding (for group) and relegation is calculated over a two year cycle, as is the promotion from Trophy competition. Addittionaly, Rugby Europe made changes to the bonus points system. The standard system, that is applied in the Six Nations Championship was discarded in favour of the French system. The main difference is that where previously a team would be awarded 1 try bonus point for scoring (at least) 4 tries, regardless of the outcome, and whereas now, a team would be awarded 1 "bonus" point for winning while scoring at least the equivalent of 3 or more tries than their opponent.

International Championships: new format (from 2022) 
From October 2022, the Rugby Europe International Championships, made up of five levels or divisions:
 Level 1 - Championship. The top eight ranked European teams outside the Six Nations contest the annual title.
 Level 2 - Trophy. The next five ranked European teams bid for the Trophy title.
 Level 3 - Conference 1
 Level 4 - Conference 2
 Level 5 - Development.
A  relegation system is maintained across all levels two-year, moving away from the one-year system in place since 2016.

Current divisions and standings (2022–2023)

Updated through 19 March 2023

Predecessor tournaments

FIRA Tournaments (1936–1938)

Rugby Union European Cup (1952–1954)

FIRA Nations Cup (1965–1973)

FIRA Trophy (1973–1997)

FIRA Tournament (1996–1999)

European Nations Cup (2000–2016)

Rugby Europe International Championships (2016–)

First Format

Second Format

Statistics (2000–present)

All-time table

Performance by team

Records (since 2000)
Updated as of 19 March 2023
Division 1A
Titles
 Most titles: 15 –  (2001, 2007–2008, 2008–2009, 2011, 2012, 2013, 2014, 2015, 2016, 2018, 2019, 2020, 2021, 2022, 2023)
 Most consecutive titles: 6 –  (2011, 2012, 2013, 2014, 2015, 2016), (2018, 2019, 2020, 2021, 2022, 2023)

Top division appearances
26 (joint record) –  (2000–present),  (2000–present)

Wins
 most wins overall: 102 – 
 most home wins overall: 51 – 
 most away wins overall: 49 – 
 most consecutive wins overall: 20 –  (10 February 2018 – 26 June 2021)
 most consecutive home wins: 31 –  (14 March 2009 – 26 June 2021)
 most consecutive away wins: 15 –  (8 February 2014 – present)

Draws
 most draws overall: 5 – 

Losses
 most losses overall: 63 – 

Points
 most points scored in a season: 389 –  (10 games – 2005–2006) 219  (5 games –  2023)
 fewest points conceded in a season: 75 –  (10 games – 2015–2016) 33  (5 games – 2016)
 most points conceded in a season: 556 –  (10 games – 2005–2006) 359  (5 games – 2018)
 fewest points scored in a season: 58 –  (10 games – 2008–2009) 34  (5 games – 2018)
 most points scored in a match: 101 – ( 98–3  7 April 2007)
 most points scored in a match by one team 98  ( 98–3  7 April 2007)
 biggest winning margin: 97 –  ( 97–0  19 March 2005)
 most points scored by losing team: 38 (joint record) – , ; matches ( 38–40 , 30 March 2003,  41–38 , 11 February 2017)
 biggest draw: 25 – ( v  6 February 2022)
 fewest points scored in a match: 12 (joint record) –  9–3  19 March 2000,  6–6 , 22 February 2004,  9–3 , 6 March 2004)
 fewest points scored by winning team: 8 ( 8–7 , 19 March 2017)

Games without a loss
 Longest unbeaten run: 30 –  (10 February 2018  – present)
 Most consecutive games without a loss home: 49 –  (6 March 2004 – present)
 Most consecutive games without a loss away: 14 –  (10 March 2012 – 19 March 2017; 17 February 2018 – present))

Games without a win
 17, joint record –  (20 November 2004 – 17 March 2012),  (15 November 2009 – 27 February 2016)

Other trophies 

Several other trophies are contested within the main competition, mostly as long-standing fixtures between pairs of teams.
 Viriato Cup: Portugal versus Spain. The most recent Viriato Cup match was won by Portugal (2023)
 Trophy of the Two Iberias: Georgia versus Spain. The most recent Trophy of the Two Iberias match was won by Georgia (2023)
 Treasure of Lipovens: Romania versus Russia. The most recent Treasure of Lipovens match was won by Russia (2021)
 Antim Cup: Romania versus Georgia. The most recent Antim Cup match was won by Georgia (2023)
Kiseleff Cup: Romania versus Russia. The most recent Kiseleff Cup match was won by Romania (2022)
 Moscow Gold: Russia versus Spain. The most recent Moscow Gold match was won by Spain (2022)
 Trajan's Column: Spain versus Romania. The most recent Trajan's Column match was won by  Romania (2023)
Coltan Cup: Portugal versus Belgium. The most recent Coltan Cup match was won by Portugal (2023)
 Suebi Bowl: Germany versus Portugal. The most recent Suebi Bowl match was won by Portugal (2019)

See also

 Rugby World Cup
 History of rugby union matches between Georgia and Romania
 Six Nations Championship
 Rugby Europe (formerly FIRA–AER)
 Sevens Grand Prix Series

References

External links
 Rugby Europe website

 
Rugby Europe tournaments
European championships